Disney Channel is an Indian pay television channel owned by The Walt Disney Company India. a wholly owned by The Walt Disney Company. The channel is the Indian equivalent to the original American network which was launched on 16 December 2004. Disney Channel is available as a pay television channel on most subscription television providers.

The channel became the fifth most watched kids channel across all genres with TRP as of October 2020.

History 
On 16 December 2004, Disney Channel India and its sister channel Toon Disney launched in India, both broadcasting in English, Hindi, Telugu and Tamil. At first, the programming of the channel consisted of Disney's original shows imported from the US, such as Lizzie McGuire, That's So Raven, The Suite Life of Zack & Cody, Hannah Montana, Wizards of Waverly Place, Sonny with a Chance, The Suite Life on Deck, Jonas LA and Phineas and Ferb.

Disney India has produced local adaptations of international live action series. The first local adaptation, Best of Luck Nikki premiered on 3 April 2011. The Disney Channel Original Movie, Phineas and Ferb Across the 2nd Dimension premiered on the channel on 25 September 2011.

2012 saw the channel's second local adaptation, The Suite Life of Karan and Kabir premiering on 8 April, as well as the first Disney Channel India Original Movie, Luck Luck Ki Baat.

In June 2014, Disney Channel India launched their first local animated series, Arjun Prince of Bali.

The channel rebranded on 17 December 2014 with the new logo used internationally, with the exception of the logo colour being purple instead of blue, and had a strategy of showing family-oriented shows during the weekend. The weekend strategy was called "Shanivaar, Ravivaar only for Parivaar". The family shows started airing on 31 January 2015. In early 2016 the channel stopped producing local live action shows, and decided to focus on Japanese anime and local animation instead as animated/anime shows drive better ratings.

On 1 May 2018, the channel's logo color was changed to blue, as used internationally. On the same month the channel launched Simple Samosa and Big Hero 6 The Series. On 1 October 2018, the DuckTales reboot premiered in India.

In 2019 the channel continued to produce and acquire more local animation and international shows from the Disney library such as Oye Golu, Bhaagam Bhaag, Amphibia, Big City Greens, Miraculous: Tales of Ladybug and Cat Noir, Super V. The Descendants trilogy premiered on Disney Channel in December 2019.

In Summer 2020, Disney Channel launched new shows such as Mira, Royal Detective, Bapu and Guddu, along with new episodes of shows like Chacha Chaudhary, Doraemon, and Selfie with Bajrangi. The channel launched a DIY show called Imagine That on 6 September 2020.

On 18 April 2021, the second season of Imagine That and 101 Dalmatian Street were aired.

Broadcast 
The channel broadcasts in India and several neighboring countries. It was formerly broadcast in Bangladesh, Pakistan and Bhutan, but was removed for the following reasons:

The Government of Bangladesh banned the Indian feeds of Disney Channel and Disney XD from broadcasting in February 2013, citing non-availability of localized dubs for content, including the anime Doraemon, which was being broadcast only in Hindi. Pogo was banned for the same reason; three other channels were also banned for broadcasting without authorization. Later, the Asian feed of Disney Channel was made available on specific Bangladeshi cable providers.

Concerns about localization were raised in Pakistan as well, regarding the broadcast of Hindi-only dubs of Doraemon. In 2016, after increasing tensions between the countries, all Indian television channels were banned from broadcast by the Pakistan Electronic Media Regulatory Authority. The ban was reiterated after appeals in 2018.

In Bhutan, the channel was similarly removed due in 2017 to most of its programming being aired in Hindi rather than in English. This was part of a uniformity plan.

Sister television channels

Disney Channel HD 
On 15 March 2023 Disney Channel HD was launched. It was originally planned by 1 March 2020 and 11 December 2021, but it was postponed.

It features a schedule that is different from the SD channel. Disney Junior programs are played in the morning hours. It also has its own branding package while the SD channel continues to use the 2014 branding.

Similar to the SD channel, Disney shows are rarely aired on the HD channel (with the exception of the morning Disney Junior block) with the majority of the schedule taken up by Doraemon and local shows.

Disney Junior 

The Playhouse Disney brand expanded to India in 2006 as a block on Disney Channel. On 4 July 2011, it was replaced by Disney Junior, which eventually became available as a 24-hour channel.

Disney International HD 

On 5 October 2017, The Walt Disney Company India officially announced the launch of Disney International HD on 29 October 2017. The channel exclusively airs international live action content from the Disney Channel library such as Austin & Ally, K.C. Undercover, Liv and Maddie, Hannah Montana as well as Disney Channel Original Movies such as Teen Beach, Descendants, Zombies and Spin.

Hungama TV 

Hungama TV was launched on 26 September 2004. The channel was originally owned by UTV Software Communications, but The Walt Disney Company India purchased it in 2006. The programming lineup mainly consists of Japanese and Indian animated shows.

Super Hungama 

Originally launched as Toon Disney on 17 December 2004, then on 14 November 2009, the channel rebranded as Disney XD. On 6 January 2019, the channel rebranded as Marvel HQ. then on 1 March 2022 the channel rebranded as Super Hungama. The channel was launched with 4 new shows, including 3 Disney shows. These are Buzz Lightyear of Star Command, Big City Greens, Milo Murphy's Law and The Daltons. Apart from that, the channel's content and schedule remains the same as Marvel HQ.

Programming 

Unlike most Disney Channel networks around the world, the channel airs very little content from the North American networks. Disney Channel India mostly focuses on local and some Japanese content as they are more popular with Indian audiences. Due to popularity of Doraemon, it has been scheduled most of the time on the channel since 2011 despite not being a Disney show to maintain high viewership. Nowadays Selfie with Bajrangi is being aired most of the day along with Doraemon and other local content.

See also 
 Disney Channel (United States)
 Hungama TV
 Super Hungama
 Pogo (TV channel)
 Cartoon Network (India)
 Nickelodeon (Pakistani TV channel)
 Disney Junior (Indian TV channel)
 Sony YAY!
 Discovery Kids

References

India
English-language television stations in India
Children's television channels in India
Television channels and stations established in 2004
Indian animation
2004 establishments in Maharashtra
Disney India Media Networks
Companies based in Mumbai
Disney Star
Television channels in Nepal
Television channels in the Maldives